Arthur J. Orloske (October 13, 1922 – January 21, 1997) was an American football coach.  Orloske was the fifth head football coach at Ithaca College in Ithaca, New York, serving for the 1956 and 1957 seasons, and compiling a record of 3–10.

References

1922 births
1997 deaths
Ithaca Bombers football coaches
People from Farmington, Michigan